La reine Fiammette is an opera in four acts by composer Xavier Leroux. The opera uses a French language libretto by Catulle Mendès which is based on Mendès's 1898 work of the same name, a conte dramatique in six acts set in Renaissance Italy. The opera's premiere was given by the Opéra-Comique at the Salle Favart theatre in Paris on 23 December 1903. The production was directed by Albert Carré and conducted by André Messager. The United States premiere of the work was given at the Metropolitan Opera in New York City on 24 January 1919. That production was directed by Richard Ordynski, conducted by Pierre Monteux, and starred Geraldine Farrar as Orlanda, Hipolito Lazaro as Danièlo, Adamo Didur as Giorgio, Léon Rothier as César, and Flora Perini as Pantasilée. Up to the Second World War the opera received 59 performances at the Opéra-Comique.

Roles

References

French-language operas
1903 operas
Operas
Operas by Xavier Leroux
Operas based on plays
Operas set in Italy